The Parklane Towers complex is a pair of twin office buildings in Dearborn, Michigan.

Parklane Towers East is located at 1 Parklane Boulevard in Dearborn, Michigan. It was constructed in 1971 and stands at 15 stories. The older of the twin buildings is used for offices, retail, and other commercial space.

Parklane Towers West is located at 3 Parklane Boulevard in Dearborn, MI. The younger of the two buildings was constructed in 1973 and stands at 15 floors in height. Designed by Rossetti architects, the high-rise is used for offices and retail space. Rossetti architects designed both towers in the modern architectural style with concrete and glass as its main materials. Joseph Pasquali was the tile setter and mechanic for the towers.

A commemorative paperweight for the dedication lists the date as June 27, 1974.

Notes

External links 
 Official Website
 Google Maps location of Parklane Towers East and West
 
 
 
 
 

Skyscrapers in Dearborn, Michigan
Buildings and structures completed in 1971
Office buildings completed in 1973
Twin towers
1971 establishments in Michigan
Skyscraper office buildings in Michigan